The simple-station Santa Isabel, is part of the TransMilenio mass-transit system of Bogotá, Colombia, opened in the year 2000.

Location 

This station is located in south-central Bogotá, more specifically on Troncal NQS with Calle 2.

It serves Santa Isabel and surrounding neighborhoods.

History 

In 2005, the NQS line of the system opened as the second line of phase two of construction. This station was opened during that expansion.

Station services

Old trunk services

Main line service

Feeder Routes 

This station does not have connections to feeder routes.

Inter-city service 

This station does not have inter-city service.

External links 
 TransMilenio

See also 
 Bogotá
 TransMilenio

TransMilenio